Harriet Dart and Asia Muhammad were the defending champions but Dart chose not to participate.

Muhammad partnered Alycia Parks and successfully defended her title, defeating Anna-Lena Friedsam and Nadiia Kichenok in the final, 6–2, 6–3.

Seeds

Draw

Draw

References

External Links
Main Draw

Dow Tennis Classic - Doubles